Matses's big-eared bat (Micronycteris matses) is a bat species found in Brazil.

References

Micronycteris
Bats of Brazil
Endemic fauna of Brazil
Mammals described in 2002